Pasqual Scanu (Alghero 1908 - Sassari 1978) was an Italian educator and writer in Catalan and Italian.

He studied in Rome and was a school teacher and later a school director in the province of Sassari (1937–1975). He was very interested in Catalan culture in Alghero and took part in almost all Catalan Floral Games since 1959.

Works 
 Alghero e la Catalogna (1962)
 Pervivència de la llengua catalana oficial a l'Alguer (1964)
 Sardegna (1964)
 Sardegna nostra (1970)
 Poesia d'Alguer (1970)
 Guida di Alghero (1971)
 Rondalles alguereses (1985)

1908 births
1978 deaths
People from Alghero
Italian male poets
Italian educators
Catalan-language writers
20th-century Italian poets
20th-century Italian male writers